Samuel Milton Halliday (September 21, 1906 – August 16, 1989) was a Canadian professional ice hockey player. He played in the National Hockey League (NHL) for the Ottawa Senators from 1926 until 1929, and was a member of the Stanley Cup-winning team of 1927. The rest of his career, which lasted from 1924 to 1939, was spent in various minor leagues.

Playing career
Born in Ottawa, Ontario, Halliday made the jump to NHL hockey from the amateur ranks of the Ottawa Gunners of the Ottawa City Hockey League, joining the hometown Ottawa Senators for the 1926–27 season. Halliday would play on a line with Hec Kilrea and Jack Duggan. That season, the Senators would defeat the Boston Bruins in the Stanley Cup championship, in the first final series between two NHL teams.

In the following two seasons, Halliday would split his time between the Senators and minor pro teams in London, Ontario and Niagara Falls, Ontario of the Canadian Pro minor league. After the 1928–29 season, Halliday would not play in the NHL again, traded by Ottawa to Hamilton, Ontario of the International League. He would play the rest of his career for various minor professional teams of the International League and the Can-Am leagues. He left professional hockey in 1936 to return to Ottawa, where he played two seasons as a reinstated amateur player for the Ottawa Montagnards of the Ottawa City League before retiring from competitive hockey.

Career statistics

Regular season and playoffs

Transactions
 October 24, 1926 – Signed as a free agent with Ottawa (NHL)
 November 7, 1929 – Traded from Ottawa (NHL) to Hamilton (IHL) for cash
 January 5, 1932 – Traded from Hamilton (IHL) to Cleveland (IHL) for Stew Dunning
 December 18, 1935 – Signed as free agent with Buffalo (IHL)
 February 7, 1936 – Signed as a free agent with Rochester (IHL)

References

Notes

External links
 

1906 births
1989 deaths
Boston Tigers (CAHL) players
Buffalo Bisons (IHL) players
Canadian expatriate ice hockey players in the United States
Canadian ice hockey left wingers
Cleveland Falcons players
Cleveland Indians (IHL) players
Hamilton Tigers (IHL) players
Ice hockey people from Ottawa
London Panthers players
Niagara Falls Cataracts players
Ottawa Senators (1917) players
Pittsburgh Yellow Jackets (IHL) players
Rochester Cardinals players
Stanley Cup champions